2531 Cambridge, provisional designation , is a stony Eoan asteroid from the outer regions of the asteroid belt, approximately 20 kilometers in diameter. It was discovered on 11 June 1980, by American astronomer Edward Bowell at Lowell's Anderson Mesa Station in Arizona, United States. The asteroid was named for the Cambridge University.

Classification and orbit 

Cambridge is a member of the Eos family, the largest asteroid family in the outer main belt consisting of nearly 10,000 known asteroids. It orbits the Sun at a distance of 2.8–3.2 AU once every 5 years and 3 months (1,906 days). Its orbit has an eccentricity of 0.06 and an inclination of 11° with respect to the ecliptic.

It was first identified as  Simeiz Observatory in 1916. The body's observation arc begins with a precovery taken at Lowell Observatory in 1931, or 49 years prior to its official discovery observation at Anderson Mesa.

Physical characteristics 

Cambridge is an assumed stony S-type asteroid, in line with the overall spectral type for members of the Eos family.

Rotation period 

In February 2004, a rotational lightcurve of Cambridge was obtained from photometric observations by French amateur astronomer René Roy. Lightcurve analysis gave a rotation period of 8.80 hours with a brightness variation of 0.21 magnitude. In October 2010, observations at the Palomar Transient Factory, California, gave a longer period of 12.200 hours with an amplitude of 0.20 magnitude.

Diameter and albedo 

According to the surveys carried out by the Infrared Astronomical Satellite IRAS, the Japanese Akari satellite, and NASA's Wide-field Infrared Survey Explorer with its subsequent NEOWISE mission, Cambridge measures between 19.15 and 23.44 kilometers in diameter and its surface has an albedo between 0.147 and 0.2104.

The Collaborative Asteroid Lightcurve Link derives an albedo of 0.2102 and a diameter of 19.15 kilometers with an absolute magnitude of 10.9, identical with the results obtained by IRAS.

Naming 

This minor planet was named after the University of Cambridge in England and the universities in the city of Cambridge, Massachusetts (United States), where the Minor Planet Center (MPC) is located at the Smithsonian Astrophysical Observatory. The approved naming citation was published by the MPC on 8 April 1982.

References

External links 
 Asteroid Lightcurve Database (LCDB), query form (info )
 Dictionary of Minor Planet Names, Google books
 Asteroids and comets rotation curves, CdR – Observatoire de Genève, Raoul Behrend
 Discovery Circumstances: Numbered Minor Planets (1)-(5000) – Minor Planet Center
 
 

002531
Discoveries by Edward L. G. Bowell
Named minor planets
19800611